The Southland Charity Golf Classic was a professional golf tournament played at Invercargill Golf Club near Invercargill in South Island, New Zealand. It was played in 1975 and 1976. The 1976 event was played at the same time as the Colgate Champion of Champions in Australia.

Winners

References 

Golf tournaments in New Zealand
Sport in Invercargill